Manchester United Football Club is an English association football club based in Old Trafford, Greater Manchester. The club was formed in Newton Heath in 1878 as Newton Heath LYR F.C., and played their first competitive match in October 1886, when they entered the First Round of the 1886–87 FA Cup. The club was renamed Manchester United F.C. in 1902, and they moved to Old Trafford in 1910. The club won its first significant trophy in 1908 – the First Division title. Since then, the club has won a further 19 league titles, along with 12 FA Cups and five League Cups, among many other honours. They have also been crowned champions of Europe on three occasions by winning the European Cup. The club was one of 22 teams in the Premier League when it was formed in 1992. They experienced the most successful period in their history under the management of Alex Ferguson, who guided the team to 13 league titles in 21 years.

Since playing their first competitive match, 955 players have appeared in competitive first-team matches for the club, many of whom have played between 25 and 99 matches (including substitute appearances). Carlos Tevez fell one short of 100 appearances for Manchester United after he joined the club as a free agent in August 2007 before departing for rivals Manchester City in 2009. Billy Whelan, George Perrins, Arnold Mühren and Diego Forlán all played 98 matches in all competitions for Manchester United. Darren Ferguson, Jesper Blomqvist and Owen Hargreaves are among the former players who have been awarded league medals; Hargreaves was also in Manchester United's victorious starting XI for the 2008 UEFA Champions League final.

As of 26 February 2023, a total of 248 players have played between 25 and 99 competitive matches for the club. Among those players, Portuguese defender Diogo Dalot is the closest to 100 appearances; he has played in 97 matches for Manchester United.


List of players

Appearances and goals are for first-team competitive matches only, including Premier League, Football League, FA Cup, League Cup, Charity/Community Shield, European Cup/Champions League, UEFA Cup/Europa League, Cup Winners' Cup, Inter-Cities Fairs Cup, Super Cup and Club World Cup matches; wartime matches are regarded as unofficial and are excluded, as are matches from the abandoned 1939–40 season.
Players are listed according to the date of their first team debut for the club.

Statistics correct as of match played 19 March 2023

Table headers
 Nationality – If a player played international football, the country or countries he played for are shown. Otherwise, the player's nationality is given as his country of birth.
 Manchester United career – The year of the player's first appearance for Manchester United to the year of his last appearance.
 Starts – The number of matches started.
 Sub – The number of matches played as a substitute.
 Total – The total number of matches played, both as a starter and as a substitute.

Notes
 A utility player is one who is considered to play in more than one position.

References
General

Specific

 
Players 25-99
Manchester United
Association football player non-biographical articles